The town of Bloemendaal has 125 listings in the register of rijksmonuments.

List

|}

References
 Rijksdienst voor het Cultureel Erfgoed KICH Rijksmonumenten Dataset

Bloemendaal

Bloemendaal